Patients Out of Time (POT) is an American medical cannabis nonprofit organization and patients rights group, established in 1995.

In 2013, the U.S. Court of Appeals for the District of Columbia Circuit ruled in a case challenging the Drug Enforcement Administration's classification of cannabis as a Schedule I drug. The lawsuit was filed by a group of organizations and patients, including Americans for Safe Access, the Coalition to Reschedule Cannabis, and Patients Out of Time.

References

External links

 

1995 establishments in the United States
1995 in cannabis
Cannabis in the United States
Cannabis organizations
Non-profit organizations based in the United States
Organizations established in 1995